La Femme Nikita is a television series from Warner Bros. and Fireworks Entertainment. The series premiered on USA Network on January 13, 1997 and ended March 4, 2001, with a total of 96 episodes over the course of five seasons.

The number of words comprising each episode's title is equal to the number of the season in which the episode first aired. Thus, for example, every third-season episode has a title that is three words long.

Series overview

Episodes

Season 1 (1997)

Season 2 (1998)

Season 3 (1999)

Season 4 (2000)

Season 5 (2001)

External links 

 
 La Femme Nikita Episode guide

Lists of Canadian drama television series episodes